Flawsome is a 2022 Nigerian Showmax Original drama series directed and created by Tola Odunsi, starring Enado Odigie, Bisola Aiyeola, Sharon Ooja, Gabriel Afolayan, Iretiola Doyle, Baaj Adebule, Shine Rosman, and Shawn Fuqua.

Plot
Flawsome revolves around the lives of four women: Ifeyinwa (Bisola Aiyeola), Ramat (Ini Dima-Okojie), Ivie (Sharon Ooja), and Dolapo (Enado Odigie). The series highlights their personal and professional lives, which are bounded by their flaws, and yet the unbreakable ties they share as friends. Ifeyinwa an heiress, preparing all her life on becoming CEO of her father’s company after his demise only to find out she isn’t her father’s chosen candidate. Ramat, has a supposedly perfect marriage, middle-class life, and a great career, but her reality isn’t as promising as it seems. Ivie is a wide-eyed young woman who abandoned her profession as a pharmacologist and a surgeon for a career in fashion design with the hopes of living the big city girl's life. Dolapo, is a career-driven woman who continues to beat the odds as she moves steadily up the corporate ladder with the biggest clients in her portfolio.

Cast

Main
 Ini Dima-Okojie as Rahmat Ekong
 Helen Enado Odigie as Dolapo Mankinde
 Bisola Aiyeola as Ifeyinwa Okoro
 Sharon Ooja as Ivie Oromoni

Supporting

Episodes
Each episode was released weekly for thirteen weeks, every Thursday on Showmax from 10 November 2022 to end on 2 February 2023.

Season 1 (2022-2023)

Production and release
The series was created and directed by Tola Odunsi, the 13-part drama series. Flawsome was set in Lagos and released on Showmax on 10 November 2022, with the official premiere being held at the Africa International Film Festival on 11 November 2022. The AFRIFF was hosted by Miz Vick, and in attended were the movie director, Tola Odunsi, and members of the cast, including Enado Odigie, Bisola Aiyeola, Sharon Ooja, Gabriel Afolayan, Iretiola Doyle, Baaj Adebule, Shine Rosman and Shawn Fuqua. During the occasion, the series director, Odunsi, said, “Showmax is made for Africans, and everything we produce is geared to suit the audience. Most women can relate to the stories in the series.”

The series director Tola Odunsi also said “I feel lost for words. I am happy that everyone is finally seeing this beautiful work we have released. Women face several challenges, and we wanted to tell a deeper story that explores these issues.” Busola Tejumola, the Executive Head of Content & West Africa Channels from MultiChoice Group, said, “Flawsome is a true depiction of our culture, society, people, and the very intricate availability of the show. I’m very confident our viewers would enjoy it.”

References

External links
 Flawsome at Showmax

2022 Nigerian television series debuts
2020s crime drama television series
English-language Showmax original programming
Nigerian drama television series